The Motala longwave transmitter is a longwave broadcasting station, established in 1927 in Motala, Sweden. Its aerial is of the T-type spun between two free standing steel framework towers, which still exist today. The transmitter was in service until 1962, when the new Orlunda longwave transmitter went in service. In 1991 Sveriges Radio AB shut down the Orlunda longwave transmitter. Since 1977, the Swedish Broadcasting Museum is co-located at the Motala longwave transmitter building, from which sometimes transmissions with low power in the longwave range take place. These transmissions may not be received well from abroad.

See also
List of tallest towers

External links
 
http://www.skyscraperpage.com/diagrams/?b45631
http://www.skyscraperpage.com/diagrams/?b45632

Towers in Sweden
Museums in Östergötland County
Telecommunications museums
Motala
1927 establishments in Sweden

sv:Motala långvåg